Jacob Bragg (born 15 May 2000) is an Australian long-distance runner who holds the world single age record for U13 half marathon.

Training 

Bragg currently trains at UQ Athletics Centre and the Queensland Sport and Athletics Centre under the training of Brian Chapman.

Career 

On 24 November 2013, Bragg represented the University of California, Los Angeles and finished 6th in the open 5,000 m event, finishing 4 seconds behind the bronze medalist at the "We run the city" event at the Campus of the University of Southern California campus.

References 

Living people
2000 births
Australian male marathon runners
Australian male long-distance runners
21st-century Australian people